
This is a list of the Sites of Special Scientific Interest (SSSIs) in West Yorkshire. English Nature, the designating body for SSSIs in England, uses the 1974–1996 county system, and the same approach is followed here, rather than, for example, merging all Yorkshire sites into a single list.

For other counties, see List of SSSIs by Area of Search.

Sites

Notes
Data rounded to one decimal place.
Grid reference is based on the British national grid reference system, also known as OSGB36, and is the system used by the Ordnance Survey.
Link to maps using the Nature on the Map service provided by English Nature.
English Nature citation sheets for each SSSI. Retrieved on 27 August 2012.

References

 
West Yorkshire
Sites